Pythium iwayamae is a plant pathogen infecting barley and wheat.

References

External links
 Index Fungorum
 USDA ARS Fungal Database

iwayamae
Water mould plant pathogens and diseases
Barley diseases
Wheat diseases